Amaelle Landais-Israël (born 27 July 1977) is a French glaciologist and climatologist. She is research director of the Laboratory of Climate and Environmental Sciences (LSCE) at the French National Centre for Scientific Research (CNRS).

Life
Landais-Israël graduated from ESPCI Paris in 2000. In 2004, she finished her doctorate in oceanology, meteorology and the environment, supervised by Jean Jouzel and Valérie Masson-Delmotte. Entitled La variabilité climatique rapide en atlantique nord: l'apport des isotopes de l'air piégé dans la glace du Groenland  it explored how atmospheric isotopes trapped in Greenland ice could be used to study rapid variations in the climate of the North Atlantic.

From 2004 to 2006, she did post-doctorate study at the Hebrew University of Jerusalem. In 2007, she was appointed research fellow at CNRS, and became research director at CNRS in 2016.

References

External links
 official website

Living people
1977 births
People from Le Mans
French glaciologists
French climatologists
Women glaciologists
Women climatologists
21st-century French scientists
21st-century French women scientists
ESPCI Paris alumni
Hebrew University of Jerusalem alumni
Research directors of the French National Centre for Scientific Research